The Tamil Nadu State Film Award for Honorary Award given by the Tamil Nadu State Government  as part of its annual Tamil Nadu State Film Awards for Tamil cinema personalities who contributed in developing the Tamil cinema in India.

Arignar Anna Award
 1990 - Manivannan, K. S. Gopalakrishnan and K. Balachander
 1991 - A. S. Prakasam, Vietnam Veedu Sundaram
 1992 - P. Bhanumathi, Krishnan
 1993 - Akkineni Nageswara Rao
 1994 - Harur Das
 1995 - T. Rajendar
 1996 - Liakath Ali Khan
 1997 - C. V. Sridhar
 1998 - S. A. Chandrasekhar, K. Swarnam
 1999 - Mahendran
 2000 - Anjali Devi
 2001 - Bharathiraja
 2002 - K. Jamuna Rani
 2006 - Rama Narayanan

Thiyagaraja Bhagavathar Award
 1999 - S. S. Rajendran
 2000 - M. N. Rajam
 2001 - Vyjayanthimala
 2002 - G. Sakunthala
2004- P Leela
 2006 - T. M. Soundararajan

Kalaivanar Award
 1989 - K. A. Thangavelu
 1992 - Vennira Aadai Moorthy, Y. G. Mahendran
 1996 - Urvashi
 1999 - Kaka Radhakrishnan
 2000 - Padmini
 2001 - Raja Sulochana
 2002 - P. B. Sreenivas
 2006 - Vivek

Kannadasan Award
 1999 - Kavingnar Kamakodiyan
 2000 - S. Varalakshmi
 2001 - Vanisri
 2002 - M. S. Viswanathan
 2006 - Pa. Vijay

M.G.R. Award
 1989 - Sivaji Ganesan, Kamal Haasan
 1990 - Gemini Ganesan, Sowcar Janaki, M. N. Nambiar, Manorama
 1991 - R. S. Manohar, Pandari Bai
 1992 - Srividya, T. R. Ramanna
 1993 - B. Sarojadevi
 1994 - Vijayakanth
 1995 - Arvind Swamy, Satyaraj
 1998 - Prabhu, Napoleon
 1999 - Jamuna, Bhagyaraj
 2000 - Vijay
 2001 - B. S. Saroja
 2002 - E. V. Saroja
 2003 - Kanchana
 2004 - Rajasree
 2005 - Prashanth, Vikram Kennedy
 2006 - AjithKumar
 2007 - Jiiva, Karthi
 2008 - Bharath Srinivasan
 2011 - Sharwanand, Karthik Kumar and Nani
 2012 - Siva Karthikeyan, Vijay Sethupathi
 2013 - Siddharth Narayan
 2014 - Gautham Karthik

Raja Sando Award

 1992 - Suhasini, A. Vincent
 1999 - S. Shankar
 2000 - Kunnakudi Vaidyanathan
 2001 - K. Balaji
 2002 - M. Saravanan
 2006 - Thangar Bachan

Sivaji Ganesan Award

 1995 - Kamal Haasan
 1996 - Arvind Swamy
 1997 - Arjun Sarja
 1998 - Prabhudeva
 1999 - Simran Bagga
 2000 - Sukumari
 2001 - Ravichandran
 2002 - M. Saroja
 2003 - Vijay Joseph
 2004 - Bharath Srinivasan
 2005 - Vishal, Jiiva
 2006 - Siddharth Narayan
 2007 - Karthi
 2008 - Suriya
 2009 - Vikram
 2012 - Vijay Sethupathi<
 2013 - Gautham Karthik
 2014 - Siva Karthikeyan

Paavender Bharathidasan Award
 1992 - Jikki, S. Janaki
 2006 - Thamarai

Jayalalithaa Award
 1992 - P. Vasu, Manorama, M. N. Nambiar
 1993 - K. Balaji

References

Tamil Nadu State Film Awards